The Year Earth Changed is a 2021 nature documentary film about the COVID-19 pandemic and its impact on nature directed by Tom Beard. It focuses on wildlife during public health lockdowns and travel restrictions from the onset of the pandemic in 2020. The film was produced by the BBC Natural History Unit as a collaboration between Mike Gunton and Alice Keens-Soper. The documentary was narrated by David Attenborough.

Apple TV+ released the documentary on April 16, 2021.

Reception 
Review aggregator website Rotten Tomatoes reported an approval rating of 100% based on 11 reviews, with an average rating of 7.9/10.

See also 

 Impact of the COVID-19 pandemic on the environment

References

External links

2021 films
2021 documentary films
American documentary films
Documentary films about the COVID-19 pandemic
Documentary films about nature
2020s English-language films
2020s American films